Ryan Gibson can refer to:

 Ryan Gibson (Australian cricketer) (born 1993), Australian cricketer
 Ryan Gibson (English cricketer) (born 1996), English cricketer